Dominika Čonč (born 1 January 1993) is a Slovenian professional footballer who plays as a midfielder for Sampdoria and the Slovenia women's national team.

References

External links

Dominika Čonč at NZS 

1993 births
Living people
Sportspeople from Maribor
Slovenian women's footballers
Women's association football midfielders
ŽNK MB Tabor players
ŽNK Krka players
UT Martin Skyhawks women's soccer players
ŽNK Mura players
Fortuna Hjørring players
RCD Espanyol Femenino players
Málaga CF Femenino players
A.C. Milan Women players
Valencia CF Femenino players
U.C. Sampdoria (women) players
Primera División (women) players
Serie A (women's football) players
Slovenia women's international footballers
Slovenian expatriate footballers
Slovenian expatriate sportspeople in the United States
Expatriate women's soccer players in the United States
Slovenian expatriate sportspeople in Denmark
Expatriate women's footballers in Denmark
Slovenian expatriate sportspeople in Spain
Expatriate women's footballers in Spain
Slovenian expatriate sportspeople in Italy
Expatriate women's footballers in Italy